The South American Baseball Championship (Spanish: Campeonato Sudamericano de Béisbol) is a competition featuring teams affiliated with the South American Confederation of Baseball (CONSUBE). The first edition was played in 1957 with 3 participating countries: Argentina, Brazil, and Peru.

Results

References

International baseball competitions in South America
1957 establishments in South America
Recurring sporting events established in 1957